Ellekutige Rufus Nemesion Susil Fernando (born 19 December 1955) is a Sri Lankan Australian former cricketer who played in five Test matches and seven One Day Internationals from 1983 to 1984.

Following the end of his cricketing career, Fernando migrated to Australia.

References

1955 births
Living people
Sri Lanka Test cricketers
Sri Lanka One Day International cricketers
Sri Lankan cricketers
Sri Lankan emigrants to Australia